In enzymology, a dimethylglycine oxidase is an enzyme that catalyzes the chemical reaction

N,N-dimethylglycine + H2O + O2  sarcosine + formaldehyde + H2O2

The 3 substrates of this enzyme are N,N-dimethylglycine, H2O, and O2, whereas its 3 products are sarcosine, formaldehyde, and H2O2.

This enzyme belongs to the family of oxidoreductases, specifically those acting on the CH-NH group of donors with oxygen as acceptor.  The systematic name of this enzyme class is N,N-dimethylglycine:oxygen oxidoreductase (demethylating). It employs one cofactor, FAD.

Structural studies

References

 

EC 1.5.3
Flavoproteins
Enzymes of known structure